Reece Hoffman (born 22 March 2001) is an Australian professional rugby league footballer who plays as a  and  for the Canterbury-Bankstown Bulldogs in the NRL.

He previously played for the Wests Tigers in the National Rugby League.

Background
Born in Brisbane, Queensland, Hoffman played his junior rugby league for the Wynnum Manly Seagulls and attended Alexandra Hills State High School.

Playing career
In 2018, Hoffman played for Wynnum Manly's Mal Meninga Cup side and later that season moved up to the Hastings Deering Colts. In 2019, he again started the season in the Mal Meninga Cup and moved up to the Colts, before making his Queensland Cup debut for the Seagulls. 

In June 2019, he represented the Queensland under-18 team before being signed by the Wests Tigers on a three-year deal.

2020
In 2020, Hoffman started the season playing for the Tigers' Jersey Flegg Cup side.

In Round 9 of the 2020 NRL season, he made NRL debut against the South Sydney Rabbitohs, scoring a try.

2022- signed with bulldogs

References

External links
Wests Tigers profile
NRL profile

2001 births
Living people
Australian rugby league players
Wests Tigers players
Western Suburbs Magpies NSW Cup players
Wynnum Manly Seagulls players
Rugby league wingers
Rugby league players from Brisbane